Bis-Man Transit is the public transportation system in the neighboring cities of Bismarck, North Dakota and Mandan, North Dakota. The scheduled transit bus routes are branded as CAT (Capital Area Transit) and operated by the non-profit Bis-Man Transit Board. The Bismarck-Mandan fixed route system is a flag down system, which means a bus can be stopped anywhere along the route, as long as it is not in a no stop zone. Paratransit for those who are unable to use the regular bus under the ADA is provided as well.

History
Bismarck formerly had an electric streetcar system from February 16, 1904, to February 28, 1931. The Bis-Man Transit Board was officially formed on April 28, 1987, with the aim of providing transportation for the elderly and those with disabilities. While a 1989 study deferred on providing fixed route transit service, paratransit service was strongly recommended and began in May 1990.

The push to start a fixed route system to serve Bismarck and Mandan began in August 2000 when consultants were hired to conduct a transit study. In February 2001, three options were explored through the study: (1) No changes, (2) Expand demand response and add 5 fixed routes, (3) Decrease demand response and add 10-12 fixed routes. Bis-Man Transit decided to pursue option 2 under the branding of Capital Area Transit (CAT). A competition was held among Bismarck State College commercial art class students to design a logo for CAT, Catherine Dalzell's winning design was chosen in December 2003. On May 6, 2004, the official dedication of Capital Area Transit took place, with the system's first rides taking place on May 10. Free rides were given during May and June to introduce the new service to the area.

Facilities
The Downtown transfer hub is located on East Front Avenue between South 5th Street and South 7th Street. Two shelters serve as the primary hub for Bis-Man Transit with 5 routes terminating here.

The Bismarck-Mandan Transit Center on East Rosser Avenue was constructed in 1998, and serves as the headquarters and maintenance facility. The facility is served by Route 5, as well as intercity buses from Jefferson Lines.

Fixed Route Ridership

The ridership and service statistics shown here are of fixed route services only and do not include demand response. Per capita statistics are based on the Bismarck urbanized area as reported in NTD data. Starting in 2011, 2010 census numbers replace the 2000 census numbers to calculate per capita statistics.

See also
 MATBUS
 Minot City Transit
 List of bus transit systems in the United States

References

External links

Bismarck, North Dakota
Mandan, North Dakota
Bismarck–Mandan
Bus transportation in North Dakota
Transportation in Burleigh County, North Dakota
Transportation in Morton County, North Dakota